Serinicoccus marinus is a Gram-positive bacterium species from the genus Serinicoccus which has been isolated from sea water from the Sea of Japan.

References 

Micrococcales
Bacteria described in 2004